The Raymond–Regway Border Crossing connects the towns of Plentywood, Montana and Minton, Saskatchewan on the Canada–US border. It is reached by Montana Highway 16 on the American side and Saskatchewan Highway 6 on the Canadian side. It was the only 24-hour crossing on the Montana–Saskatchewan segment of the border.  It is also the easternmost crossing in Montana. The US border station was built in 1937 and replaced in 2005. Canada's previous border station, which was built in 1978, is still in use and expected to be replaced in the near future.

See also
 List of Canada–United States border crossings

References 

Canada–United States border crossings
Geography of Saskatchewan
1931 establishments in Montana
1931 establishments in Saskatchewan
Buildings and structures in Sheridan County, Montana
Division No. 2, Saskatchewan